Darvit (also Romanized as Darvīt; also known as Darvīd) is a village in Qalkhani Rural District, Gahvareh District, Dalahu County, Kermanshah Province, Iran. At the 2006 census, its population was 304, in 66 families.

References 

Populated places in Dalahu County